Josh is a 2009 Indian Kannada language romantic film directed and written by Shivamani. Produced by Sanjay Babu under SVP pictures, the film mainly stars debutants Rakesh Adiga, Poorna, Nithya Menen, Akshay, Vishnu Prasanna in the pivotal roles whilst Dwarakish, Achyuth Kumar, Tulasi Shivamani and Sihi Kahi Chandru feature in supporting roles. The music is composed by Vardhan, making his debut.

The film released on 10 April 2009 across Karnataka and went on to become one of the highest grossers at the box-collection for the year. The film had a run over a hundred days at cinema halls. The film was remade in Telugu and Tamil as Keratam and Yuvan, respectively.

Cast 

 Rakesh Adiga as Rocky
 Poorna as Meena
 Nithya Menen as Meera
 Vishnu Prasanna
 Akshay
 Alok Babu
 Amith
 Robot Ganesh
 Sharan
 Dwarakish
 Sihi Kahi Chandru
 Tulasi Shivamani
 Achyuth Kumar
 Srinivas Prabhu
 Harish Davangere 
Shivaji Rao Jadhav 
 Sneha Acharya
 Chethana
Jagannath Chandrashekhar
Ganesh Rao Kesarkar
M. S. Rajashekhar 
Kuri Prakash 
Sudha Belawadi 
Shashidhar Kote 
Chidanand M. S 
Karibasavaiah
Bhaskar Surya

Soundtrack 

All the songs are composed by Vardhan teaming up with the director and producer for the first time with Shivamani. The songs were well received and remained at the top of the charts.

Awards 

 Best Film – Nominated
 Best Director – Nominated
 
 Best Supporting Actor -Sharan – Nominated
  – -Won
 Best Supporting Actress -Nithya Menen – Nominated
 Best Lyricist -Kaviraj – Nominated

3) Suvarna Film Awards
 Best Debut Actor – Rakesh Adiga – Won

Reception 
A critic from Sify opined that "Student and parents should watch this film without fail".

References

External links 
 Josh review

2009 films
2000s Kannada-language films
Indian romance films
2009 romance films
Indian coming-of-age films
Kannada films remade in other languages
2000s coming-of-age films
Films scored by Vardhan